Twin Lakes is a game production area located in Roswell Township, Miner County, South Dakota.

References

Miner County, South Dakota